K-128 is a  north–south state highway in the U.S. state of Kansas. K-128's southern terminus is at U.S. Route 24 (US-24) and K-9 northwest of Glen Elder, and the northern terminus continues as Nebraska Highway 78 (N-78) at the Nebraska border north of Burr Oak. West of Mankato, a small section of K-128 is co-designated as US-36.

Before state highways were numbered in Kansas, there were auto trails, which were an informal network of marked routes that existed in the United States and Canada in the early part of the 20th century. The section of K-128 that overlaps with US-36 was part of the Pikes Peak Ocean to Ocean Highway auto trail. K-128 was first designated on January 7, 1937, and ran from US-24 and K-9 north to US-36. In February 1996, K-28 was truncated to K-14 in Jewell, and the section of K-28 from US-36 to the Nebraska state line became an extension of K-128.

Route description
K-128 begins at an intersection with K-9 and US-24 just north of Waconda Lake and northwest of Glen Elder in Mitchell County. After entering Jewell County it continues northward, following to the west of Limestone Creek, a tributary of the Solomon River. About  past the county line, K-128 crosses West Limestone Creek, a tributary of Limestone Creek. From K-228, the highway continues northward until it reaches US-36.

At US-36, K-128 turns eastward and runs concurrent with US-36 for about  then turns northward and leaves US-36, which continues east toward Mankato. As it continues north through the city it crosses White Rock Creek, a tributary of the Republican River, then exits the city. Just north of Burr Oak it crosses Walnut Creek then Wolf Creek, both tributaries of White Rock Creek. About  later, K-128 intersects Cedar Road, also known as Rural Secondary 336 (RS-336). At Cedar Road, K-128 turns westward for  before turning back north at Cedar Road (RS-335). From here, K-128 continues northward for  before reaching N-78 at the Nebraska state line.

The Kansas Department of Transportation (KDOT) tracks the traffic levels on its highways, and in 2017, they determined that on average the traffic varied from 295 vehicles per day slightly north of Burr Oak to 1410 vehicles per day along the concurrency with US-36. The only section of K-128 that is included in the National Highway System is its concurrency with US-36. The National Highway System is a system of highways important to the nation's defense, economy, and mobility. K-128 also connects to the National Highway System at its junction with US-24.

History

Early roads
Before state highways were numbered in Kansas there were auto trails, which were an informal network of marked routes that existed in the United States and Canada in the early part of the 20th century. The section of K-128 that overlaps with US-36 was part of the Pikes Peak Ocean to Ocean Highway. The southern terminus was part of the Roosevelt National Highway, Kansas White Way, and Sunflower Trail.

Establishment and realignments
K-128 was assigned by the State Highway Commission of Kansas on January 7, 1937, and ran from US-24 and K-9 north to US-36. K-128 originally ran directly north–south through Ionia until it was moved slightly westward to a new alignment in 1945, and at that time K-228 was created to link Ionia to the new alignment. The United States Bureau of Reclamation began purchasing rights-of-way in June 1963, and then started constructing the Glen Elder Dam and Waconda Lake in November 1964. On February 8, 1996, K-28 was truncated to K-14 in Jewell and the section of K-28 from US-36 to the Nebraska state line became an extension of K-128, which created a short overlap with US-36.

Major intersections

References

External links

Kansas Department of Transportation State Map
KDOT: Historic State Maps

128
Transportation in Mitchell County, Kansas
Transportation in Jewell County, Kansas